Clint Robinson may refer to:

Clint Robinson (canoeist) (born 1972), Australian canoeist
Clint Robinson (baseball) (born 1985), American baseball player